Joseph Contreras (c. 1710 – c. 1780), was a Spanish violin maker. 

Contreras was born around 1710, in Granada, Spain(hence his commonly used nickname 'el Granadino'). He probably lived in Italy during his early life, his style being Italian.  He worked in Madrid from about 1745, as violin maker and repairer to the Spanish Court.  This brought him into contact with some of the best violins of his day, including examples by Stradivarius and Guarnerius.  He is famous for the copies of these instruments which he made, using fine materials and exceptional skill. 

Only a few of his instruments have survived today, and are highly prized.  Famous players of Contreras violins have included Shlomo Mintz, Nigel Kennedy and members of the Endellion Quartet.  He died in approximately 1780, leaving a son (also called Joseph) to continue the family business.  His violins contain the label 'Matriti per Granadensem Josephum Contreras, anno ....'

References
Los Luthiers Españoles by Ramón Pinto Comas, 1988. 
 The Golden Age of Violin Making in Spain, 2014. 

1710 births
1782 deaths
People from Granada
Spanish luthiers
Bowed string instrument makers
18th-century Spanish businesspeople